The Italian Catholic Diocese of Carpi is in Emilia Romagna, Italy. It is a suffragan of the Archdiocese of Modena-Nonantola.

History

The city and territory of Carpi belonged originally to the Countess Matilda (1046–1115), from whom it passed in 1115 to the Holy See. From 1215 to 1319 it was subject to Modena and from then until 1525 was ruled by the Pio family, vassals of the Holy See.

Under Pope Julius II (1512) and Pope Leo X (1515) the Archpriesthood of the Collegiate Church of Carpi, and its territory, became immediately dependent on the Holy See, nullius dioecesis, having previously been under the jurisdiction of the diocese of Modena.

Carpi was created a see only in 1779, by Pope Pius VI, in the Bull Inter plurimas and assigned as a suffragan to the diocese of Bologna. The right of nomination of a bishop during a vacancy was granted to the Duke of Modena, provided that a nomination was made within a time fixed by the pope. The new Cathedral was assigned a Chapter, which was to consist of four dignities (the Archpriest, the Archdeacon, the Provost, and the Dean) and seventeen Canons. The town (oppidum) of Carpi was raised to the status of a city (civitas).

The first bishop was the former Jesuit, Francesco Benincasa, whose Religious Order had been dissolved by Pope Clement XIV in 1773. Benincasa protested so loudly and publicly that he was arrested on 25 December 1773, and was jailed until 12 September 1775. Benincasa was consecrated a bishop on 9 April 1780 by the Bishop of Modena, Giuseppe Maria Fogliani. He was assigned a part of the ducal residence as his episcopal palace.

In 1855 the diocese of Carpi was made a suffragan of the diocese of Modena by Pope Pius IX.

In 1922, the diocese had a Catholic population of c. 78,000, with 31 parishes; there were 78 diocesan priests, 4 priests of Religious Orders, 18 seminarians, 4 brothers and 54 sisters. The diocese in 2018 has thirty-nine parishes, including the cathedral parish.

Bishops
Francesco Benincasa, S.J. (1779–1793)
Carlo Belloni (1794–1800)
Giacomo Boschi (1807–1815)
Filippo Cattani (1822–1826)
Adeodato Antonio Caleffi, O.S.B. (1826–1830)
Clemente Maria Bassetti (1831–1839)
Pietro Raffaelli (1839–1849)
Gaetano Maria Cattani (1850–1863)
Gherardo Araldi (1871–1891 Resigned)
Andrea Righetti (1891–1924)
Giovanni Pranzini (1924–1935)
Carlo de Ferrari, C.S.S. (1935–1941)
Vigilio Federico Dalla Zuanna, O.F.M. Cap. (1941–1952 Resigned)
Artemio Prati (1952–1983 Retired)
Alessandro Maggiolini (1983–1989)
Bassano Staffieri (1989–1999)
Elio Tinti (2000–2011 Retired)
Francesco Cavina (2011– )

Notes and references

Books

 p. 759.
 pp. 175–176.

Acknowledgment

Carpi
Diocese
Religious organizations established in 1779
Carpi